Council of National Assemblies of Montenegro is a non-governmental organization that represents the historical tribes of Montenegro. Representatives include notable intellectuals. The Directoring board president is Nikola Kusovac and Assembly president is Momčilo Vuksanović (as of 2016).

The organization issued a declaration against the accession of Montenegro to NATO, signed by 72 representatives of 24 historical tribes, on 21 March 2016. The manifestation was held at the Podgorica cathedral.

References

Sources

Ethnic organisations based in Montenegro